Chad Davidson (born 1970 in Southern California) is an American poet and translator.

Biography
Chad Davidson holds a BA, MA, and PhD in English from Cal State San Bernardino, the University of North Texas, and Binghamton University, respectively. He is currently Associate Professor of English at the University of West Georgia. His poems and articles have appeared in AGNI, Colorado Review, Hotel Amerika, The Paris Review, Prairie Schooner, Shenandoah, Virginia Quarterly Review, The Writer's Chronicle, and elsewhere.

Awards
 Crab Orchard Prize in Poetry

Publications

Poetry collections
 
 
 Chad Davidson and John Poch.

Non-Fiction

 Chad Davidson and Gregory Fraser. 
 Chad Davidson and Gregory Fraser.

Anthologies

Online Works
"Cockroaches: Ars Poetica", poets.org
"Consolation Miracle", poets.org
"The Match", poets.org
"The Pear", poets.org
"This is the Cow", poets.org
"Encryption", Tarpaulin Sky, Winter 2002
"HOCKEY HAIKU x 10", Diagram 5.1, Chad Davidson and John Poch
"Labor Days", Ploughshares, Spring 2008

References

External links
"Chad Davidson", Fishouse
"Emerging Poet: On Chad Davidson", poets.org, B. H. Fairchild 
"Chad Davidson Reading for Smartish Pace, Chicago", YouTube
"Chad Davidson reads “Frost at Midnight” by Samuel Taylor Coleridge", Poets on Poets

1970 births
Living people
American male poets
University of West Georgia faculty
21st-century American poets
21st-century American male writers